Mordecai Ehrenpreis (25 June 1869 – 26 February 1951) was a Hebrew author, publisher and Zionist activist. From 1914 until his death he served as chief rabbi of Stockholm.

Biography
Mordechai (Marcus) Ehrenpreis was born in Lviv.  As a young man, he wrote in Yiddish. He studied at German universities and the Hochschule für die Wissenschaft des Judentums in Berlin. From 1884 he wrote for the Hebrew newspapers Ha-Maggid and Ha-Meliz. From 1896 to 1900 he was a rabbi in Đakovo, Croatia. Even before Herzl, Ehrenpreis, Nathan Birnbaum and others began to  define the concept of a new national Judaism.

Ehrenpreis died in 1951 in Saltsjöbaden, Sweden.

Zionist activism 
Ehrenpreis was an early adherent of Zionism and helped Herzl establish the first  Zionist Congress. He was a member of the Democratic Fraction, an opposition group at the Zionist Congress that lobbied for cultural as opposed to political Zionism. Ehrenpreis ultimately supported both views and wrote "Perhaps victory will go in the end to a third, synthetic view that will unite cultural and political Zionism together.” He was an avid supporter of teaching the Hebrew language to all Jewish children.

Rabbinic and literary career
From 1900 to 1914 he was in Sofia as Chief rabbi of Bulgaria and also publisher of several Spaniolic magazines. After 1908 his interest in Zionism and in the Hebrew literature decreased noticeably which earned him some criticism. From 1914 until his death he served as chief rabbi of Stockholm.

In 1928 he founded the Judisk Tidskrift, was engaged as a translator as well as scientific writer for different encyclopedias, since 1935 he became a professor at Stockholm University. During his time in Sweden he published some 20 books in Swedish. 

Ehrenpreis emphasized the importance of seeking understanding for Jewish culture in the modern world and sought to create a synthesis between a general culture and the inherited culture of the Jewish minority.  

Ehrenpreis was the chairman of  Arbetsutskottet för hjälp åt Polens judar, devoted to sending aid in the form of food, medicine, clothes and money, primarily to Poland but increasingly also to other parts of Nazi-occupied Europe.

Ehrenpreis was also the Chairman of the Swedish Section of World Jewish Congress from its institution in 1944 and was succeeded by historian and pioneering scholar of antisemitism, Hugo Valentin. Ehrenpreis was also involved in planning the attempt by Raoul Wallenberg to rescue Hungarian Jews. Wallenberg visited him at his home on 5 July, the evening before he left for Budapest. Ehrenpreis was consequently one of the last people to see Wallenberg alive in Sweden.

Awards and recognition
In 1935, the King of Sweden conferred on him the title of Professor. Earlier, he was decorated by the King with the Order of Chevalier of the North Star.

References

Further reading

 
 Lexikon des Judentums, Gütersloh 1971
 Theodor Herzl, Briefe und Tagebücher, Berlin/Frankfurt a. M./Wien 1983-1996
 Svante Hansson, Flykt och överlevnad..., Stockholm: Hillel, 2004, pp. 75-76, 121, 266.
 Stephen Fruitman, Creating a New Heart : Marcus Ehrenpreis on Jewry and Judaism, Umeå 2001.
 Rudberg, Pontus, "‘A Record of Infamy’: the use and abuse of the image of the Swedish Jewish response to the Holocaust", Scandinavian Journal of History, Volume 36, Issue 5, Special Issue: The Histories and Memories of the Holocaust in Scandinavia (2011).
 Rudberg, Pontus, "The Swedish Jews and the Holocaust", Abingon & New York (2017)

External links
 The personal papers of Mordecai Ehrenpreis are kept at the   Central Zionist Archives in Jerusalem

1869 births
1951 deaths
Rabbis of the Austrian Empire
20th-century Croatian rabbis
Chief rabbis
Rabbis from Galicia (Eastern Europe)
Bulgarian Orthodox rabbis
Swedish Ashkenazi Jews
Swedish rabbis
Zionist activists
Academic staff of Stockholm University
Swedish people of Polish-Jewish descent
Swedish magazine founders
Hochschule für die Wissenschaft des Judentums alumni
Rabbis from Lviv
Swedish Zionists
Yiddish-language writers
Hebrew-language writers
Clergy from Stockholm